The 2017 Nordic Futsal Championship, was the seventh edition of the Nordic Futsal Championship hosted by Espoo, Finland.

Group stage

Group A

Group B

Final round

5th/6th place match

Third place match

Final

Awards

 Winner:  SoVo Futsal
 Runners-up:  Golden Futsal Team
 Third-Place:  Köbenhavn Futsal
 Top scorer:
 Best Player:

Final standing

References

 Futsal Planet

2017
2017–18 in European futsal
2017
2017 in Finnish football
Sport in Espoo